Cheryl R. Ganz (born 1950), FRPSL is an American philatelist who was appointed to the Roll of Distinguished Philatelists in 2018.

Family and education
After her husband's death, Ganz studied United States history at University of Illinois Chicago (UIC) where she earned her PhD in 2005.

Philately
Ganz has been a collector from an early age, collecting, stamps, coins, seashells but as a teenager became interested in Zeppelins and mail carried on the airships.

In October 2005 Ganz joined the staff of the Smithsonian National Postal Museum in Washington and from January 2007 until February 2014 she was its chief curator. Following her retirement she was appointed "curator of philately emerita" for her "significant and lasting contributions" to the museum; the first employee to win this title.

Ganz is a board director of the American Philatelic Society, a society she has been a member of since 1976. She serves as vice-chair on the United States Postal Service’s Citizens' Stamp Advisory Committee.

Honors
Ganz has been awarded several philatelic honors including:
 2015 Alumni Achievement Award – University of Illinois, Chicago
 2016 Lichtenstein Medal for Distinguished Service to Philately – Collectors Club of New York
 2016 Luff Award for Exceptional Contributions to Philately – American Philatelic Society
 2018 Roll of Distinguished Philatelists of the Royal Philatelic Society London

Publications

References

American philatelists
Living people
Signatories to the Roll of Distinguished Philatelists
Philatelic authors
Fellows of the Royal Philatelic Society London
Women philatelists
1950 births